Riders of the Dawn is a 1945 American Western film directed by Oliver Drake and starring Jimmy Wakely, Lee 'Lasses' White and Sarah Padden. It was produced and distributed by Monogram Pictures. The film's sets were designed by the art director Vin Taylor.

Cast
 Jimmy Wakely as Jimmy Wakely 
 Lee 'Lasses' White as Lasses White 
 John James as Dusty Smith 
 Sarah Padden as Melinda Pringle 
 Horace Murphy as Sheriff Beasley 
 Phyllis Adair as Penny Pringle 
 Jack Baxley as Doc Judd Thomas 
 The Texas Stars as Band

References

Bibliography
 Terry, Rowan. The American Western A Complete Film Guide. 2013.

External links
 

1945 films
1945 Western (genre) films
American Western (genre) films
Films directed by Oliver Drake
Monogram Pictures films
American black-and-white films
1940s English-language films
1940s American films